Climazolam (Ro21-3982) was introduced under licence as a veterinary medicine by the Swiss Pharmaceutical company Gräub under the tradename Climasol. Climazolam is a benzodiazepine, specifically an imidazobenzodiazepine derivative developed by Hoffman-LaRoche. It is similar in structure to midazolam and diclazepam and is used in veterinary medicine for anesthetizing animals.

References

Benzodiazepines
Chloroarenes
GABAA receptor positive allosteric modulators
Imidazobenzodiazepines
Veterinary drugs